Western University College of Podiatric Medicine (WesternU-CPM) is a podiatric medical school at Western University of Health Sciences (WesternU) based in Pomona, California. WesternU-CPM is one of nine podiatric medical schools in the United States, and one of nine colleges at Western University of Health Sciences. The school was founded in 2009 with an inaugural class of 38 students and is fully accredited by the American Podiatric Medical Association's Council on Podiatric Medical Education (CPME). Westernu-CPM offers a four-year professional degree program leading to the degree Doctor of Podiatric Medicine (DPM).

History
The College of Podiatric Medicine was founded in 2009 at Western University of Health Sciences. The inaugural class consisted of 38 students; the college currently has about 100 students. In November 2012, the Council on Podiatric Medical Education granted the college full accreditation.

In 2010, Osteomed, a small bone implant device company, donated the first of five $20,000 payments to a scholarship fund for podiatry students at Western University of Health Sciences. The donation marked the start of the college's first endowed scholarship fund.

Academics

The College of Podiatric Medicine offers a single four-year professional degree program leading to the degree Doctor of Podiatric Medicine (DPM). First and second year podiatric medical students take the same courses as the osteopathic medical students from the osteopathic medical college on campus. The first two years of coursework focus on the basic sciences with a systems-based approach to basic clinical sciences. Subjects include biochemistry, pharmacology, immunology, hematology, oncology, neuroscience, psychiatry, rheumatology, endocrinology, cardiology, nephrology, pulmonology, reproductive medicine, dermatology, and gastroenterology.

The curriculum at the College of Podiatric Medicine includes Interprofessional Education (IPE), a program that involves 9 colleges at WesternU. The IPE program aims to demonstrate an understanding of other health professions and to provide and promote a team approach to patient care and health care management, leading to improved patient care. While a debate exists on the effectiveness of interprofessional education in encouraging collaborative practice, IPE is becoming a more common component of medical school curriculum in the United States, and many groups, including the World Health Organization, view it as a means of reducing medical errors and improving the health care system.

Third and fourth year students complete clinical rotations through many of the local hospitals, such as Arrowhead Regional Medical Center, Riverside County Regional Medical Center, Olive View–UCLA Medical Center, Downey Regional Medical Center, and Veterans Administration facilities. The rotations provide hands-on experience in various specialties of medicine, including internal medicine, family medicine, emergency, pediatrics, surgery, cardiology, anesthesia, orthopedics, and podiatric medicine. Students also have the option of pursuing clinical rotations outside of California for their fourth year.

There are two optional programs offered to podiatry students at WesternU. An Intensive Summer Anatomy Course is available for students that have an interest in anatomy, and the Summer Medical Sciences Preparatory Program is offered to students interested in an introduction to gross anatomy, biochemistry, and osteopathic manipulative medicine.

Students at WesternU-CPM may choose to complete a Master of Science in Health Sciences (MSHS) degree in addition to their Doctor of Podiatric Medicine.

Accreditation
The College of Podiatric Medicine is fully accredited by the American Podiatric Medical Association's Council on Podiatric Medical Education (CPME), an independent, specialized accrediting agency. Western University of Health Sciences is accredited by the Accrediting Commission for Senior Colleges and Universities of the Western Association of Schools and Colleges (WASC). The WASC Accrediting Commission granted approval of the substantive change proposal for the Doctor of Podiatric Medicine on December 8, 2008.

Notable faculty
 Lawrence B. Harkless, professor, researcher, and podiatric medical school dean, described as the "father of diabetic foot care."

See also
 Western University College of Veterinary Medicine
 Western University College of Osteopathic Medicine – California campus
 Western University College of Osteopathic Medicine – Oregon campus

References

External links 
WesternU College of Podiatric Medicine Homepage

Education in Pomona, California
Educational institutions established in 2009
Podiatric medical schools in the United States
Universities and colleges in Los Angeles County, California
Buildings and structures in Pomona, California
Podiatric
2009 establishments in California